Tina Parker is an American actress and director known for her role of Francesca Liddy, Saul Goodman's assistant on Breaking Bad and Better Call Saul.

Career 
Parker currently serves as the Co-Artistic Director and Administrative Director at Kitchen Dog Theater. Active with the company since 1993, she has been directly involved, as an actor, director, or designer, with over 50 productions.

Filmography

Film

Television

References

External links

Year of birth missing (living people)
Living people
American television actresses
American film actresses
21st-century American actresses